Orthogonius solidus is a species of ground beetle in the subfamily Orthogoniinae. It was first described by Tian & Deuve in 2006.

References

solidus
Beetles described in 2006